Durochertoppen is a mountain peak in Wedel Jarlsberg Land at Spitsbergen, Svalbard.

Location 
It has a height of 782 m.a.s.l. and is located in the Martinfjella mountain range. The summit is named after French geologist Joseph Marie Elisabeth Durocher.

References

Mountains of Spitsbergen